Zofia Maria Batycka (August 22, 1907, Lesko  - April 6, 1989,  Los Angeles) was a Polish  model and actress. She won the title of Miss Polonia 1930 and Miss Paramount 1931.

Filmography
1929 – Szlakiem hańby  
1929 – Grzeszna miłość
1930 – Dusze w niewoli 
1930 – Moralność Pani Dulskiej
1931 – Kobieta, która się śmieje 
1931 – Dziesięciu z Pawiaka

References

1907 births
1989 deaths
People from Lviv Oblast
People from the Kingdom of Galicia and Lodomeria
Polish female models
Polish actresses
Polish silent film actresses
20th-century Polish actresses
Miss Polonia winners